Gunboat is a simulation video game developed and released by Accolade in 1990 for MS-DOS. Ports were released for the Amstrad CPC, ZX Spectrum, Amiga and TurboGrafx-16. It is a combat simulator of a Patrol Boat, River (PBR).

Gameplay
The game starts out in Vietnam during the Vietnam War. When the player earns a second lieutenant's bar, the game moves on to battle the drug kingpins of Colombia. After making the grade of lieutenant commander, the player may begin patrolling the Panama Canal Zone.

The player uses the keyboard, the function keys, and the joystick to move through a number of stations aboard the PBR, including those for the pilot, the stern gunner, and the midship gunner. The pilot controls the searchlights and the ship's speed, and can identify targets for the gunners, and command the crew to open or cease fire.

Each weapon station has a specific gun type: M2 Heavy MG, M134 Gatling Gun, Mk19 Automatic Grenade Launcher, Etc. Each of the weapon is better for certain type of targets, which in turn sometimes requires maneuvering the boat in respective angle of that weapon to the target.

Reception
Brad Bombardiere reviewed the game for Computer Gaming World, and stated that "For those who have tired of their flight or tank simulators, make a splash with Gunboat, a high speed combat "rollercoaster" ride offering both authenticity and good old shoot-'em- up fun."

Gunboat was rated 9/10 in VideoGames & Computer Entertainment. The PC version of the game received 4 out of 5 stars in Dragon, while the Amiga version of the game received 3 out of 5 stars. A 1992 Computer Gaming World survey of wargames with modern settings gave the game three stars out of five, and a 1994 survey gave it two-plus stars.

See also
 Battlefield Vietnam
 SEAL Team

References

External links
Gunboat at MobyGames
Gunboat at GameFAQs
 Gunboat at the Hall of Light

1990 video games
Accolade (company) games
Amiga games
Amstrad CPC games
DOS games
Naval video games
Ship simulation games
TurboGrafx-16 games
Video games developed in the United States
Video games set in Colombia
Video games set in Panama
Video games set in Vietnam
Vietnam War video games
ZX Spectrum games